The Battle of Ruíz was one of the most violent clashes between criminal organizations in Mexico between Sinaloa Cartel and Los Zetas.

History

After the split from Gulf Cartel, Los Zetas started to attack his ex-ally and the other rival cartels. Gulf Cartel, Sinaloa Cartel and La Familia Michoacana do a coalition to contrast Los Zetas and this one began a coalition with Juárez Cartel and Beltrán-Leyva Cartel starting violent clashes all over Mexico. On 25 may 2011, near Ruiz, Nayarit, Sinaloa Cartel attack a convoy of Los Zetas starting a violent battle in which two Narco tanks were used. At the end of the battle, one of the most violent among drug cartels, there were a total of 29 dead, including a Guatemalan, 3 wounded and a narco tank destroyed, according to the police all the victims were all hitmen and for the most part zetas.

See also
Infighting in Los Zetas
Mexican drug war

References

Battles of the Mexican drug war
Organized crime conflicts in Mexico
Los Zetas
Sinaloa Cartel
Battles in 2011